Alan Robbins (born February 5, 1943) is a former American politician in the state of California. Robbins is most noted for his arrest and conviction on racketeering charges and serving five years in a federal prison.

Early life and education 
On February 5, 1945, Robbins was born in Philadelphia, Pennsylvania. In 1949, Robbins' family moved to Southern California. Robbins attended North Hollywood High School. In 1963, Robbins graduated with a Bachelor's degree in political science from the University of California, Los Angeles. In 1966, Robbins earned his Juris Doctor degree from UCLA School of Law.

Career 
In 1966 at age 23, Robbins was admitted to the State Bar of California. In 1967, Robbins served in the California Army National Guard. In 1968, Robbins served in the United States Naval Reserve. He practiced real estate law in Los Angeles, California and served as California State Senator from 1974 to 1991. On November 20, 1991, Robbins resigned from the California State Senate.

Federal crime 
Robbins pleaded guilty to federal racketeering and income tax evasion charges in connection with the Shrimpscam scandal, and was sentenced to five years in federal prison on May 2, 1992.

Robbins served his time in a federal prison in Lompoc, California. Robbins was released after 18 months in federal prison, although his sentence was five years. Robbins spent another two months in a half-way house.

Personal life 
Robbins' ex-wife is Miriam Elbaum. Miriam Elbaum's father was Nate Elbaum. Robbins has two children, Jacob Robbins and Leah Robbins.

While Robbins was serving time in prison, his Encino home was rented to Ted Titmas. In the late 1990s, Robbins resides in Westwood neighborhood of Los Angeles, California.

See also 
 1990 California State Senate election
 BRISPEC sting operation (Shrimpscam)
 Jewish United Fund

References

External links 
 Chatsworth Developer Charged in Money-Laundering Scheme - Bernie Lavitch loaned illegal gambling proceeds to Robbins.
 Alan Robbins at upinthevalley.org
 "Alan+Robbins" Alan Robbins media at sfgate.com
 Join California Alan Robbins

1943 births
Living people
California lawyers
Democratic Party California state senators
University of California, Los Angeles alumni
California politicians convicted of crimes
North Hollywood High School alumni
Politicians from Philadelphia
20th-century American politicians